Sulaymaniya District is a district of Sulaymaniyah Governorate, in the Kurdistan Region, Iraq. Its main city is Sulaymaniyah, the capital of the Governorate.

References 

Districts of Sulaymaniyah Province
Geography of Iraqi Kurdistan